Christa Päffgen (16 October 1938 – 18 July 1988), known by her stage name Nico, was a German singer, songwriter, actress and model. She had roles in several films, including Federico Fellini's La Dolce Vita (1960) and Andy Warhol's Chelsea Girls (1966). Reviewer Richard Goldstein describes Nico as "half goddess, half icicle" and writes that her distinctive voice "sounds something like a cello getting up in the morning".

At the insistence of Warhol, she sang on three songs of the Velvet Underground's debut album The Velvet Underground & Nico (1967). At the same time, she started a solo career and released Chelsea Girl (1967). Nico's friend, Jim Morrison, suggested that she start writing her own material. She then composed songs on a harmonium, not traditionally a rock instrument. John Cale of the Velvet Underground became her musical arranger and produced The Marble Index (1968), Desertshore (1970), The End... (1974) and other subsequent albums.

In the 1980s, she toured extensively in Europe, United States, Australia and Japan. After a concert in Berlin in June 1988, she went on holiday in Ibiza to rest and died as the result of a cycling accident.

Early life
Nico was born Christa Päffgen in Cologne to Wilhelm and Margarete "Grete" Päffgen (née Schulze, 1910–1970). Wilhelm was born into the wealthy Päffgen Kölsch master brewer family dynasty in Cologne and was Catholic, while Grete came from a lower-class background and was Protestant. When Nico was two years old, she moved with her mother and grandfather to the Spreewald forest outside Berlin to escape the World War II bombardments of Cologne.

Her father was conscripted into the  Wehrmacht at the onset of the war, but there are several conflicting accounts as to when and how he died. According to biographer Richard Witts in his 1995 book, Nico: The Life and Lies of an Icon, Wilhelm Päffgen was gravely wounded in 1942 after having been shot in the head by a French sniper. With no certainty that he would survive, his commanding officer, following standing orders, ended his life by gunshot. Another story is that he sustained head injuries that caused severe brain damage, and spent the rest of his life in a psychiatric institution. According to unproven rumours, he was variously said to have died in a concentration camp, or to have faded away as a result of shell shock.

In 1946, Nico and her mother relocated to downtown Berlin, where Nico worked as a seamstress. She attended school until the age of 13, and began selling lingerie in the exclusive department store KaDeWe, eventually getting modelling jobs in Berlin. At , and with chiseled features and pale skin, Nico rose to prominence as a fashion model when still a teenager. At the age of 15 while working as a temp for the US Air Force, she was allegedly raped by an American sergeant and she gave evidence at the trial which led to the perpetrator being court-martialed. The incident was referenced in her song Secret Side. However, biographers such as Richard Witts have debated the validity of the story as no public records of the case have been documented.

Career

Acting and modelling (1954–1964)
Nico was discovered at 16 by the photographer Herbert Tobias while both were working at a KaDeWe fashion show in Berlin. He gave her the name "Nico" after a man he had fallen in love with, filmmaker Nikos Papatakis, and she used it for the rest of her life. She moved to Paris and began working for Vogue, Tempo, Vie Nuove, Mascotte Spettacolo, Camera, Elle, and other fashion magazines. Around this time, she dyed her brown hair blonde, later claiming she was inspired to do so by Ernest Hemingway. At age 17, she was contracted by Coco Chanel to promote their products, but she fled to New York City and abandoned the job. Through her travels, she learned to speak English, Spanish, and French.

In 1959, she was invited to the set of Federico Fellini's La Dolce Vita, where she attracted the attention of the acclaimed director, who gave her a minor role in the film as herself. By that time, she was living in New York and taking acting classes with Lee Strasberg.

After a role in the 1961 Jean Paul Belmondo film A Man Named Rocca, she appeared as the cover model on jazz pianist Bill Evans' 1962 album, Moon Beams. After splitting her time between New York and Paris, she got the lead role in Jacques Poitrenaud's Strip-Tease (1963). She recorded the title track, which was written by Serge Gainsbourg but not released until 2001, when it was included in the compilation Le Cinéma de Serge Gainsbourg.

Early singing work
In 1965, Nico met the Rolling Stones guitarist Brian Jones and recorded her first single, "I'm Not Sayin'", with the B-side "The Last Mile", produced by Jimmy Page for Andrew Loog Oldham's Immediate label. Actor Ben Carruthers introduced her to Bob Dylan in Paris that summer. In 1967, Nico recorded his song "I'll Keep It with Mine" for her first album, Chelsea Girl.

The Velvet Underground (1966–67)

After being introduced by Brian Jones, she began working in New York with Andy Warhol and Paul Morrissey on their experimental films, including Chelsea Girls, The Closet, Sunset and Imitation of Christ. Warhol began managing the Velvet Underground, a New York City rock band and he proposed that the group take on Nico as a "chanteuse", an idea to which they consented, reluctantly for both personal and musical reasons.

The group became the centerpiece of Warhol's Exploding Plastic Inevitable, a multimedia performance featuring music, lighting, film and dance. Nico sang lead vocals on three songs ("Femme Fatale", "All Tomorrow's Parties", "I'll Be Your Mirror"), and backing vocal on "Sunday Morning", on the band's debut album, The Velvet Underground & Nico (1967). Reviewer Richard Goldstein describes Nico as "half goddess, half icicle" and writes that her Velvet Underground vocal "sounds something like a cello getting up in the morning".

Nico's tenure with the Velvet Underground was marked by personal and musical difficulties. Multi-instrumentalist John Cale wrote that Nico's long dressing room preparations, and pre-performance ritual of burning a candle, often held up performances, which especially irritated songwriter Lou Reed. Nico's partial deafness sometimes caused her to veer off key, for which she was ridiculed by other band members. The album became a classic, ranked 13th on Rolling Stones 500 Greatest Albums of All Time, though it was poorly received at the time of its release.

Early solo career (1967–1977)
Immediately following her musical work with the Velvet Underground, Nico began work as a solo artist, performing regularly at The Dom in New York City. At these shows, she was accompanied by a revolving cast of guitarists, including members of the Velvet Underground, Tim Hardin, Tim Buckley, Ramblin' Jack Elliott and Jackson Browne.

For her debut album, 1967's Chelsea Girl, she recorded songs by Bob Dylan, Tim Hardin, and Jackson Browne, among others. Velvet Underground members Lou Reed, John Cale and Sterling Morrison contributed to the album, with Nico, Reed and Cale co-writing one song, "It Was a Pleasure Then." Chelsea Girl is a traditional chamber-folk album, with strings and flute arrangements by producer Tom Wilson. Nico had little say in its production, and was disappointed with the result; she said in 1981: "I still cannot listen to it, because everything I wanted for that record, they took it away. I asked for drums, they said no. I asked for more guitars, they said no. And I asked for simplicity, and they covered it in flutes! ... They added strings, and— I didn't like them, but I could live with them. But the flute! The first time I heard the album, I cried and it was all because of the flute." In California, Nico spent time with Jim Morrison of the Doors, who encouraged her to write her own songs.

For The Marble Index, released in 1968, Nico wrote the lyrics and music. Nico's harmonium anchored the accompaniment, while John Cale added an array of folk and classical instruments, and arranged the album. The harmonium became her signature instrument for the rest of her career. The album has a classical-cum-European folk sound. The album also marked a radical change in Nico's appearance and image. She once again dyed her hair, this time from blonde to red, and began dressing mostly in black, a look that would be considered a visual prototype for the gothic rock scene that would emerge in subsequent years.

A promotional film for the song "Evening of Light" was filmed by Francois de Menil. This video featured the now red-haired Nico and Iggy Pop of The Stooges.

Returning to live performance in the early 1970s, Nico (accompanying herself on harmonium) gave concerts in Amsterdam as well as London, where she and John Cale opened for Pink Floyd. 1972 saw a one-off live reunion of Nico, Cale and Lou Reed at the Bataclan in Paris.

Nico released two more solo albums in the 1970s, Desertshore (1970) and The End... (1974). She wrote the music, sang, and played the harmonium. Cale produced and played most of the other instruments on both albums. The End... featured Brian Eno on synthesizer and Phil Manzanera on guitar, both from Roxy Music. She appeared at the Rainbow Theatre, in London, with Cale, Eno, and Kevin Ayers. The album June 1, 1974 was the result of this concert. Nico performed a version of the Doors' "The End", which was the catalyst for The End... later that year.

Between 1970 and 1979, Nico made about seven films with French director Philippe Garrel. She met Garrel in 1969 and contributed the song "The Falconer" to his film Le Lit de la Vierge. Soon after, she was living with Garrel and became a central figure in his cinematic and personal circles. Nico's first acting appearance with Garrel occurred in his 1972 film, La Cicatrice Intérieure. Nico also supplied the music for this film and collaborated closely with the director. She also appeared in the Garrel films Anathor (1972); the silent Jean Seberg feature Les Hautes Solitudes, released in 1974; Un ange passe (1975); Le Berceau de cristal (1976), starring Pierre Clémenti, Nico and Anita Pallenberg; and Voyage au jardin des morts (1978). His 1991 film J'entends Plus la Guitare is dedicated to Nico.

On 13 December 1974, Nico opened for Tangerine Dream's infamous concert at Reims Cathedral in Reims, France.

Around this time, Nico became involved with Berliner musician Lutz Ulbrich, guitarist for Ash Ra Tempel. Ulbrich would accompany Nico on guitar at many of her subsequent concerts through the rest of the decade. Also in this time period, Nico let her hair return to its natural brown color but continued wearing mostly black. This would be her public image from then on.

Nico and Island Records allegedly had many disputes during this time, and in 1975 the label dropped her from their roster.

Later solo career (1978–1988)

In September 1978, Nico performed at the Canet Roc '78 festival in Spain. Also performing at this event were Blondie, Kevin Ayers, and Ultravox. She made a vocal contribution to Neuronium's second album, Vuelo Químico, as she was at the studio, by chance, while it was being recorded in Barcelona in 1978 by Michel Huygen, Carlos Guirao and Albert Gimenez. She read excerpts from "Ulalume" by Edgar Allan Poe. She said that she was deeply moved by the music, so she could not help but make a contribution. During the same year, Nico briefly toured as supporting act for Siouxsie and the Banshees, one of many post-punk bands who namechecked her. In Paris, Patti Smith bought a new harmonium for Nico after her original was stolen.

Nico returned to New York in 1979 where her comeback concert at CBGB (accompanied by John Cale and Lutz Ulbrich) was reviewed positively in The New York Times. She began playing regularly at the Squat Theatre and other venues with Jim Tisdall accompanying her on harp and Gittler guitar. They played together on a sold-out tour of twelve cities in the East and Midwest. At some shows, she was accompanied on guitar by Cheetah Chrome (the Dead Boys).

In France, Nico was introduced to photographer Antoine Giacomoni. Giacomoni's photos of Nico would be used for her next album, and would eventually be featured in a book (Nico: Photographies, Horizon Illimite, Paris, 2002). Through Antoine Giacomoni, she met Corsican bassist Philippe Quilichini. Nico recorded her next studio album, Drama of Exile, in 1981. produced by Philippe Quilichini. Mahamad Hadi aka Mad Sheer Khan played oriental rock guitar and wrote all the oriental production. It was a departure from her earlier work with John Cale, featuring a mixture of rock and Middle Eastern arrangements. For this album, in addition to originals like "Genghis Khan" and "Sixty Forty", Nico recorded covers of the Velvet Underground's "I'm Waiting for the Man" and David Bowie's "Heroes". Drama of Exile was released twice, in two different versions, the second appearing in 1983.

After relocating to Manchester, England, in the early 1980s, Nico acquired a manager, the influential Factory Records executive and promoter Alan Wise, and began working with a variety of backing bands for her many live performances. These bands included, chronologically, Blue Orchids, the Bedlamites and the Faction.

In 1981, Nico released the Philippe Quilichini-produced single "Saeta"/"Vegas" on Flicknife Records. The following year saw another single, "Procession" produced by Martin Hannett and featuring The Invisible Girls. Included on the "Procession" single was a new version of The Velvet Underground's "All Tomorrow's Parties".

Nico toured in 1982 with post-punk band Blue Orchids as her backing band. At the time, her work impacted the emerging gothic rock scene. At Salford University in 1982, she joined Bauhaus for a performance of "I'm Waiting for the Man". That same year, Nico's supporting acts included The Sisters of Mercy and Gene Loves Jezebel. In September 1982, Nico performed at the Deeside Leisure Centre for the Futurama Festival. The line-up for this show also included The Damned, Dead or Alive, Southern Death Cult, Danse Society and The Membranes. After the end of her work with the Blue Orchids, she hired musical arranger James Young and his band the Faction for her concerts.

The live compilations 1982 Tour Diary and En Personne En Europe were released in November 1982 on the 1/2 Records cassette label in France; the ROIR cassette label reissued the former under the revised title "Do Or Die!" in 1983. These releases were followed by more live performances throughout Europe over the next few years.

She recorded her final solo album, Camera Obscura, in 1985, with the Faction (James Young and Graham Dids). Produced by John Cale, it featured Nico's version of the Richard Rodgers/Lorenz Hart song "My Funny Valentine". The album's closing song was an updated version of "König", which she had previously recorded for La cicatrice interieure. This was the only song on the album sung in German or to feature only Nico's voice and harmonium. A music video for "My Heart Is Empty" was filmed at The Fridge in Brixton.

The next few years saw frequent live performances by Nico, with tours of Europe, Japan and Australia (usually with the Faction or the Bedlamites). A number of Nico's performances towards the end of her life were recorded and released, including 1982's Heroine, Nico in Tokyo, and Behind the Iron Curtain.

In March 1988, she and Young hired new guitarist Henry Olsen: together, they composed new songs to be premiered at a festival organized by Lutz Ulbrich at the Berlin Planetarium in June. Nico was then inspired by Egyptian music and Egyptian singer and diva Oum Kalthoum. Young stated that the new material was "good enough to be a springboard to a new record" with an Egyptian orchestra. The Berlin concert ended with a song from The End..., "You Forget to Answer".

A duet called "Your Kisses Burn" with singer Marc Almond was her last studio recording (about a month before her death). It was released a few months after her death on Almond's album The Stars We Are. The recording of the 1988 Berlin concert, was later released with the title Nico's Last Concert: Fata Morgana.

Personal life
Nico had an affair with French actor Alain Delon and, on 11 August 1962, gave birth to their son, Christian Aaron Boulogne, whom she called Ari. Delon denied paternity and Nico had difficulty raising Ari, so the boy was raised by Delon's parents. Ari became a photographer and actor, and had a son, born in 1999, and a daughter, born in 2006.

Nico saw herself as part of a tradition of bohemian artists, which she traced back to the Romanticism of the early 19th century. She led a nomadic life, living in different countries. Apart from Germany, where she grew up, and Spain, where she died, Nico lived in Italy and France in the 1950s, spent most of the 1960s in the US, and lived in London in the early 1960s and again in the 1980s, when she moved between London and Manchester.

The final years of her life were mainly spent in the Prestwich and Salford area of Greater Manchester. Although she was still struggling with addiction, she became interested in music again. For a few months in the 1980s, she shared an apartment in Brixton, London, with punk poet John Cooper Clarke but not as a couple.

Nico was a heroin addict for over 15 years. In the book Songs They Never Play on the Radio, James Young, a member of her band in the 1980s, recalls many examples of her troubling behaviour due to her "overwhelming" addiction – and that Nico claimed never to have taken the drug while in the Velvets/Factory scene but only began using during her relationship with Philippe Garrel in the 1970s.

In his autobiography, Cheetah Chrome depicted his friendship with a strung-out Nico in the 1980s and their mutual dependency.

Shortly before her death, Nico stopped using heroin and began methadone replacement therapy as well as a regimen of bicycle exercise and healthy eating.

Nico's friend Danny Fields, the American journalist who helped her sign to Elektra Records, described her as "Nazi-esque", saying: "Every once in a while there'd be something about Jews and I'd be, 'But Nico, I'm Jewish,' and she was like 'Yes, yes, I don't mean you.' According to Fields, in the early 1970s, Nico attacked a mixed-race woman at the Chelsea Hotel with a smashed wine glass, sticking it in her eye while saying, "I hate black people". Island Records dropped Nico after she told an interviewer that she did not like "Negroes" and that they had "features like animals". Nico said she had been raped at the age of thirteen by a black American soldier who had been court-martialed and executed; the biographer Richard Witts could find no record of this, even "when similar incidents were assiduously documented".

In 2019, Nigel Bagley, Nico's co-manager and promoter in Manchester, claimed he never saw Nico express racist views, stating: "She was in a multicultural city and was good friends with Yankee Bill, our American-Jamaican doorman." Her drummer Graham Dowdall said: "She played an Indian instrument, worked with north Africans, and brought that to her music. She was certainly capable of very casual racism about Alan [Wise], who was Jewish, but that was a way of having a go at Al."

Death

On 17 July 1988, during a holiday with Ari on the Spanish island of Ibiza, Nico hit her head when she fell off her bicycle. A passing taxi driver found her unconscious, but had difficulty getting her admitted to local hospitals. She was misdiagnosed as suffering from heat exposure and was declared dead at 8:00 pm. X-rays later revealed a severe cerebral hemorrhage as the cause of death. Her son later said of the incident:

Nico's cremated remains are buried in her mother's plot in Grunewald, a forest cemetery in Berlin. Friends played a tape of "Mütterlein", a song from Desertshore, at her funeral.

Legacy
Nico directly inspired many musicians, including Siouxsie and the Banshees, The Cure, Morrissey, Elliott Smith and Björk. Siouxsie and the Banshees invited her as special guest on their first major UK tour in 1978; they also later covered "All Tomorrow's Parties". The Cure's leader Robert Smith has cited Desertshore as one of his favourite records, as has Björk. Joy Division's Peter Hook cited Chelsea Girl as one of his favourite albums. Bauhaus' singer, Peter Murphy, considered that "Nico recorded the first truly Gothic album, Marble lndex or The End. Nico was Gothic, but she was Mary Shelley to everyone else's Hammer Horror. They both did Frankenstein, but Nico's was real." Morrissey cited Nico when asked to name artists who had a lasting influence on him: "The royal three remain the same: the New York Dolls, Frank Sinatra, Elvis Presley, with Nico standing firm as first reserve." Morrissey also said of the song "Innocent and Vain": "this is my youth in one piece of music". Elliott Smith covered "Chelsea Girls" and "These Days" in Portland, Oregon in October 1999; he also cited The Marble Index as one of his perfect 2.45am albums. Marc Almond recorded a cover version of "The Falconer": she was one of the "things I was obsessed about at school" due to her "wonderful intriguing voice, icy and remote yet warm at the same time". Patti Smith did a concert tribute to Nico in 2014 in which she covered "I Will Be Seven". Low wrote a song titled "Those Girls (Song For Nico)" and Neko Case covered "Afraid" in 2013.

Marianne Faithfull recorded "Song For Nico" on her LP Kissin' Time in 2002.

Two of Nico's songs from Chelsea Girl, "The Fairest of the Seasons" and "These Days", both written by Jackson Browne, were featured in Wes Anderson's film The Royal Tenenbaums.

Several biographical works on Nico have appeared, both in print and film. The first, in 1992, was Songs They Never Play on the Radio, a book by James Young that draws on his association with Nico in her last years. In 1993, Nico: The Life and Lies of an Icon by musicologist Richard Witts covered Nico's entire life and career. The 1995 documentary Nico Icon by Susanne Ofteringer examined the many facets of Nico's life with contributions from those who knew her, including her colleagues Reed and Cale. In 2015, Lutz Graf-Ulbrich, Nico's former partner and accompanist in the late 1970s, published Nico: In the Shadow of the Moon Goddess, an account of his time with Nico. In the 2018 biopic Nico, 1988 directed by Susanna Nicchiarelli, Trine Dyrholm portrays Nico on a journey across Europe during her last tour.

In 2019, Manchester International Festival put on a production called The Nico Project. It was a theatrical re-telling of Nico's 1968 album The Marble Index starring Maxine Peake.

In 2021, the book "You Are Beautiful and You Are Alone: The Biography of Nico", by Jennifer Otter Bickerdike, was released.

Tributes
Several concerts to honour Nico's career were organized over the years with multiple singers to revisit her repertoire. In 1981 Texas punk band Really Red released an original song in tribute to Nico. In 2005, alternative rock band Anberlin released their second studio album, Never Take Friendship Personal, which includes the song "Dance, Dance Christa Päffgen," inspired by Nico, whose given name was Christa Päffgen. The song references her struggle with drugs and unrelated death. Two Nico tribute concerts took place in Europe in the autumn of 2008 to commemorate the 70th anniversary of Nico's birth and the 20th anniversary of her death. On 11 October 2008, John Cale, James Dean Bradfield (of Manic Street Preachers), Fyfe Dangerfield of the Guillemots, Mark Linkous (of Sparklehorse), Peter Murphy (of Bauhaus), Lisa Gerrard of Dead Can Dance and Mark Lanegan appeared on stage at the Royal Festival Hall in London. On 17 October 2008 at the Volksbuehne in Berlin, Nico's ex-boyfriend Lutz Ulbrich, who was her musical collaborator in the late 1970s, presented another tribute concert, which featured Marianne Rosenberg, Soap&Skin, Marianne Enzensberger and James Young, the keyboardist from The Faction, Nico's last band.

Performance artist Tammy Faye Starlite (Tammy Lang) enjoyed success in 2011 with her one-woman show Nico: 'Chelsea Mädchen', in which she impersonates the singer and delivers spoken material based on an actual interview Nico gave in the mid-Eighties, during an Australian tour.

In 2012, X-TG (featuring members of industrial band Throbbing Gristle) released a re-interpretation of the Desertshore album.

In January 2013, John Cale organized a tribute A Life Along the Borderline at the Brooklyn Academy of Music in New York City. Performers included Cale, Kim Gordon with Bill Nace, Sharon Van Etten, Meshell Ndegeocello, Stephin Merritt, Peaches, Alison Mosshart, Joan As Police Woman, Greg Dulli, Yeasayer, and Mercury Rev.

The song "Last Ride" on Beach House's 2018 album 7 "was inspired by" Nico, according to lead singer Victoria Legrand.

Discography

According to The Great Rock Discography:

Studio albums

EP

Live albums

Compilation albums

Unofficial releases

In 2002, Faust Records released two collections of obscure Nico tracks, Reich der Träume (Realm of Dreams) and Walpurgis-Nacht (Walpurgis Night).

Singles

Bibliography
Nico: The Life and Lies of an Icon by Richard Witts (Virgin Books: London, 1992).
Up-tight: the Velvet Underground Story by Victor Bockris and Gerard Malanga (Omnibus Press: London, 1995 reprint).
 Songs They Never Play on the Radio: Nico, the Last Bohemian  by James Young, Bloomsbury, London 1992 
Nico: Photographies by Antoine Giacomoni, (Dragoon: Paris, 2002).
Nico: Cible mouvante. Chansons, Poèmes, Journal by Nico, Jacques Pauvert and Ari Boulogne, (Pauvert: Paris, 2001).
L'amour n'oublie jamais by Ari Boulogne, (Pauvert: Paris, 2001).
Please Kill Me: The Uncensored Oral History of Punk by Legs McNeil and Gillian Mccain, (Grove Press: New York, 1996).
Lüül: Ein Musikerleben zwischen Agitation Free, Ashra, Nico, der Neuen Deutschen Welle und den 17 Hippies by Lutz Ulbrich (Schwarzkopf & Schwarzkopf: Berlin, 2007).
Nico - In The Shadow of the Moon Goddess by Lutz Graf-Ulbrich (E-book, Amazon Digital Services, 2015).
You Are Beautiful and You Are Alone: The Biography of Nico, by Jennifer Otter Bickerdike, Faber (2021), 512 pp.

Films and plays
Nico – In Memoriam (1988), documentary directed by Bernd Gaul
Nico Icon (1995), documentary directed by Susanne Ofteringer
 Nico Icon Play, play by Stella Grundy, premièred at Studio Salford on 5 September 2007
 Nico. Sphinx aus Eis (2005), by Werner Fritsch
 Nico, 1988 (2018), directed by Susanna Nicchiarelli with actress Trine Dyrholm as Nico.
 The Nico Project (2019), co-created by Sarah Frankcom (director) and Maxine Peake (performer), performed at Manchester International Festival 2019.

References

External links

Habits of Waste, Pt. 1 Evaluation of Nico's early work
Habits of Waste, Pt. 2 Evaluation of Nico's later work
Nico, the Voice of Disaffected Youth – Audio story from National Public Radio
Nico (BBC Radio 4 Woman's Hour audio item)

Nico – In Memoriam Video on demand link to 1988 concert documentary

1938 births
1988 deaths
Women rock singers
German rock musicians
German film actresses
German female models
The Velvet Underground members
Lee Strasberg Theatre and Film Institute alumni
Cycling road incident deaths
Protopunk musicians
Harmonium players
Immediate Records artists
Verve Records artists
Elektra Records artists
Reprise Records artists
Island Records artists
Beggars Banquet Records artists
20th-century German actresses
German expatriates in Italy
German expatriates in France
German expatriates in the United Kingdom
German expatriates in Spain
German expatriates in the United States
German organists
German keyboardists
Tambourine players
German composers
German women composers
Actresses from Berlin
Musicians from Berlin
Art rock musicians
Folk rock musicians
German folk musicians
German experimental musicians
Avant-garde composers
Avant-garde keyboardists
Avant-garde musicians
Rock keyboardists
Road incident deaths in Spain
20th-century American composers
Women organists
20th-century German women singers
20th-century American drummers
People associated with The Factory
20th-century women composers
German contraltos
Women punk rock singers